The Tashkent Marathon (also known as the Tashkent International Marathon or the Nowruz International Marathon) is an annual road-based marathon hosted by Tashkent, Uzbekistan, since 2019.  It is a World Athletics Label Road Race.  During the race weekend, a half marathon, a 10K, and a marathon-length ekiden are also offered.

History 

The 2022 edition of the marathon was held concurrently with a half marathon hosted by the Shanghai Cooperation Organisation.  This was also the first edition that World Athletics granted the race its Label Road Race status.  In addition, following Russia's invasion of Ukraine that began about a month earlier, Russian runners were banned from the event.

Course 

The course begins outside Humo Arena, runs counterclockwise on a roughly circular route around the center of the city, and turns around after a quarter-marathon, shortly before the circle is completed.  Marathoners then run back to the start along largely the same route.  This loop is then repeated to complete the marathon distance.

Winners

Notes

References

External links 
 Official website

2019 establishments in Uzbekistan
Annual events in Uzbekistan
Athletics competitions in Uzbekistan
Marathons in Asia
March sporting events
Recurring sporting events established in 2019
Sports competitions in Tashkent
Spring (season) events in Uzbekistan